Lovers in Araby is a 1924 British silent adventure film directed by Adrian Brunel and starring Annette Benson, Miles Mander and Norman Penrose. Much of the film was shot on location in North Africa.

Cast
 Annette Benson as Nadine Melville  
 Miles Mander as Derek Fare  
 Norman Penrose as Paul Melville  
 Adrian Brunel as Martin Carme

References

Bibliography
 Low, Rachael. History of the British Film, 1918-1929. George Allen & Unwin, 1971.

External links

1924 films
1924 adventure films
British adventure films
Films directed by Adrian Brunel
British silent feature films
British black-and-white films
1920s English-language films
1920s British films
Silent adventure films